The Devil You Know is an album by the industrial alternative rock band Econoline Crush. It was released in Canada in June 1997 by EMI, and in the United States in March 1998 by Restless Records. While they are still only popular in Canada for the most part, this album helped to increase Econoline Crush's exposure in the United States more than their previous album.

Tracks 12 through 22 of the album are silent; track 23 consists of a Biblical passage (I Corinthians 13:4-8) recited in Japanese.

Touring and promotion
Econoline Crush spent a year on the road supporting the record. They performed with artists such as Green Day, Foo Fighters, The Tea Party, Alice Cooper, and Kiss. When opening for Kiss in Edmonton during their 1997 reunion tour, the band were left devastated when the crowd of 18,000 started chanting "We want Kiss" only a few songs into their set.

Appearances in other media
Remixes of "Sparkle and Shine", "Nowhere Now", and "Surefire" were featured in the PlayStation game Sled Storm. "All That You Are" was used in the pilot episode of Sci-Fi Channel's Being Human.

Reception
Greg Prato of AllMusic called The Devil You Know "their best album yet." He commented that "It could very well prove to be their big U.S. breakthrough (they're already stars in Canada)" and believed the music on the album was characterized by "buzzing guitars, frenetic drumming, vocals that alternate between sung and screamed, and subtle electronic experiments."

Track listing
All songs by Trevor Hurst, Robbie Morfitt and Daniel Yaremko except as noted.

Tracks 12 through 22 of the album are silent; track 23 consists of a Biblical passage (I Corinthians 13:4-8) recited in Japanese.

The Japanese version of the CD includes 2 bonus tracks, "Home (Remix)" and "Wicked".

Chart performance (singles)

Personnel
 Trevor Hurst - vocals
 Robbie Morfitt - guitars
 Ziggy - guitars
 Robert Wagner - drums & percussion
 Don Binns - bass & acoustic guitar
 Ken Fleming - live bass
 Statik - programming

References

1997 albums
Econoline Crush albums
Albums produced by Sylvia Massy
Albums recorded at Sound City Studios
EMI Records albums
Restless Records albums